The following are the squads for 2017 FIBA AmeriCup.

Ages and clubs are as of the opening day of the tournament on 25 August 2017.

Group A

Brazil

Colombia

Mexico

Puerto Rico

Group B

Argentina
 

<noinclude>

Canada

U.S. Virgin Islands
 

<noinclude>

Venezuela

Group C

Dominican Republic

Panama

United States

|}
| style="vertical-align:top;" |
 Head coach
  Jeff Van Gundy
 Assistant coach(es)
  Tyrone Ellis
  Mo McHone

Legend
Club – describes lastclub before the tournament
Age – describes ageon August 25, 2017
|}<noinclude>

Uruguay

References

External links
 

FIBA AmeriCup squads
Squads